Gloucester Tramways Company operated a horse-drawn tramway service in Gloucester between 1879 and 1904.

History

In 1877, when The Gloucester Tramways Company submitted details of a system to the City Council. Gloucester Tramways Company was a subsidiary of the Imperial Tramways Company. The Company obtained an order under the Tramways Act on 8 April 1878.

Track laying started on 16 September 1878. By 24 May 1879, the system was ready for inspection by the Railway Inspector, Colonel Hutchinson.

Services

The company provided services on 3 routes:
The Fleece in at Wotton along London Road, Northgate Street to The Cross, then Southgate Street to Theresa Place on Bristol Road.
St. Nicholas Church in Westgate Street to The Cross, then Eastgate Street, Lower Barton Street to India Road.
Kingsholm on Denmark Road, via Northgate Street to The Cross, then to The Royal Infirmary on Southgate Street.

Closure

On 30 September 1902 the Corporation bought out the Tramways Company The purchase price was finally agreed at £26,000.

The sale included the India Road and Bristol Road depots, 100 horses, 14 tram cars, 8 horse buses, and 6 charabancs.

The Council established a new company, the Gloucester Corporation Tramways, for the purpose of modernising the tramway.

References

External links
 Gloucester Tramways at the British Tramway Company Badges and Buttons website.

Tram transport in England
1879 establishments in England
Transport in Gloucester
4 ft gauge railways in England
Transport companies established in 1879
British companies established in 1879